The statue of Minerva may refer to:

 Statue of Minerva, Guadalajara, Jalisco, Mexico
 Statue of Minerva (Madrid), Spain